"Fight Song" is a song recorded by American singer and songwriter Rachel Platten, released as a single by Columbia Records on February 19, 2015. It appears on her extended play (EP) of the same name (2015) and on her major label debut studio album Trust in Me, and third overall, Wildfire (2016). Platten co-wrote the song with Dave Bassett.

The song peaked at number six on the Billboard Hot 100 and topped the charts in the United Kingdom and Poland. It also peaked within the top ten of the singles charts in Australia, Canada, New Zealand and Ireland, and the top twenty in Slovakia. It has sold six million copies in the United States, earning a 6× Platinum certification by the RIAA.

Composition 
In the version published at Musicnotes.com by Platten Music Publishing, the sheet music is in the key of G major with a moderate tempo of 88 beats per minute. The song follows a chord progression of G – D – Em – C, and Platten's vocals span from G3 to E5. Musically, "Fight Song" is a pop rock song backed by a piano.  "Fight Song" starts off with a simple melody played on the piano, as Platten starts to sing the first stanza and pre-chorus which introduces a drum and horns that play throughout. The song ends with an acoustic guitar, as Platten sings the outro. It has a duration of three minutes and twenty-two seconds.

Critical reception
"Fight Song" has received positive reviews from critics, who agree that the song's positive message and Platten's vocals were the song's strongest features. A review by Markos Papatados from the Digital Journal stated "The lyrics for 'Fight Song' are captivating and they tug at the heartstrings. It is a track from her Fight Song EP, which was released on May 15. Platten's vocals are crisp and impressive, where the listener can recall such songstresses as Taylor Swift and Tristan Prettyman. Her lyrics are powerful and they paint a vivid picture in the minds of her listeners."

Commercial performance
The song first charted in Australia, debuting at 35 on the ARIA Charts on April 12, 2015. The song eventually peaked at number 2 in Australia on July 12, 2015. It later reached number 8 in New Zealand after first being covered as a charity single by The X Factor top 12.

The song debuted on the Billboard Hot 100 chart of May 2, 2015 at number 80, becoming Platten's first entry on the chart. On July 18, 2015, the song entered the top 10 at number 10, becoming her first top 10. On August 19, 2015, the song eventually peaked at number 6. It has also reached quadruple platinum sales in the US, selling over 2 million copies in Platten's home country. "Fight Song" also peaked at number one on the Billboard Adult Top 40 chart for 4 weeks, number one on the  Billboard Adult Contemporary chart for 4 weeks, number 3 on the Billboard Digital Songs chart, number 1 on the Billboard Radio Songs chart, and number 8 on the Pop Songs chart. Elsewhere, it peaked at number 5 on the Billboard Canadian Hot 100.

In the United Kingdom, the song jumped from number sixty eight to the top of the UK Singles Chart on August 28, 2015 – for the week ending date September 3, 2015 – becoming Platten's first chart-topping song, and overall top ten hit, in Britain.

In the Republic of Ireland, the song peaked at number six on the Irish Singles Chart.

On April 25, 2016, this song peaked at number nine on the Billboard Japan Hot 100 chart.

Music video
An accompanying music video directed by James Lees was released on May 19, 2015. The shooting lasted four days. Platten said of the concept: "I wanted my video to show both sides of that – my fear and pain – but I also hoped to show that sometimes to overcome battles we just have to let go."

Live performances

On April 25, 2015, Platten performed the song for the first time at the 2015 Radio Disney Music Awards. Platten appeared as a special guest during  Taylor Swifts 1989 World Tour in Philadelphia on June 13, 2015, where Platten and Swift performed "Fight Song" together. On August 16, 2015, Platten performed the song at the 2015 Teen Choice Awards in Los Angeles. On July 12, 2016, Platten performed "Fight Song" at the 2016 Major League Baseball All-Star Game at Petco Park in San Diego, where baseball fans and players held up cards with the names of people they knew were battling cancer to dedicate the performance to them. On New Year's Eve 2016−17, Platten sang the song as part of her lineup during the Times Square Ball festivities in New York City's Times Square, which she co-headlined.

Usage in media
The song has been featured in the television shows The Voice and Dancing with the Stars in addition to advertisements for Ford cars and the first trailer of the series Supergirl. This song was debuted on the series Pretty Little Liars, from the episode "How the 'A' Stole Christmas" in December 2014, before the song was officially released.
"Fight Song" was named the official theme song for the 2015 "Rise Above Cancer" campaign that appeared on most WWE shows throughout the month of October as part of the company's partnership with Susan G. Komen.
The song has been used in a series of Ford TV commercials for their line of SUV's, namely, the 2015 Ford Edge and 2016 Ford Explorer.
"Fight Song" was named the official theme song of the 2016 IIHF World Women's U18 Championship held in St. Catharines, Ontario, Canada. Each game was opened with images of the participating countries as well as flag bearers who represented each country at centre ice as the song played.
The song was frequently used by Hillary Clinton at events in her campaign for the 2016 presidential election in conjunction with the slogan "Fighting for Us" and was played during her entrance, and just before her acceptance speech, on the closing night of the 2016 Democratic National Convention.
Calysta Bevier sang "Fight Song" during her audition for the eleventh season of America's Got Talent in 2016. Bevier also sang the same song at a high school talent show, which went on to become a viral video, landing her on The Ellen DeGeneres Show singing the same song with Rachel Platten.
An a cappella version of the song titled "Our Fight Song" was released for the 2016 Democratic National Convention by Elizabeth Banks, featuring some of her Pitch Perfect co-stars Ben Platt, Chrissie Fit, Ester Dean, Hana Mae Lee, John Michael Higgins, Kelley Jakle, Mike Tompkins, Shelley Regner along with celebrity supporters Aisha Tyler, Alan Cumming, America Ferrera, Billy Porter, Connie Britton, Ellen Greene, Eva Longoria, Garrett Clayton, Ian Somerhalder, Idina Menzel, Jaime King, Jane Fonda, Jesse Tyler Ferguson, Josh Lucas, Julie Bowen, Kathy Najimy, Kristin Chenoweth, Mandy Moore, Mary McCormack, Mary-Louise Parker, Nikki Reed, Renee Fleming, Rob Reiner, Sia, T. R. Knight and Platten herself.
 The song also appears in the 2018 live action/CGI film Peter Rabbit, as well as the background music for the introduction video of F1 2016.
In February 2017, Nickelodeon covered the main chorus portion of the song to promote the launch of the series Nella the Princess Knight.
Since 2017, the song has been used as the opening theme for the Stephanie Miller Show which airs in a number of US Markets as well as on SiriusXM's Progress Channel 127.
Since 2019, the song has been used as the opening theme for JonesTV's coverage of the Scottish Cup.
"Fight Song" appears multiple times in the 2022 mini-series Fleishman Is in Trouble, including a version in Hebrew, translated and performed by Yuval Ben-Ami.

Track listing
Digital download – single
"Fight Song" – 3:22
"Lone Ranger" – 3:07

Other versions
 Dave Audé Remix
 Dave Audé Radio Edit
 DJ Mike D Remix
 DJ Mike D Radio Mix

Charts and certifications

Weekly charts

Year-end charts

Certifications

See also
 List of Billboard Adult Contemporary number ones of 2015

References

External links
 

2015 singles
2015 songs
Rachel Platten songs
Hillary Clinton 2016 presidential campaign
Songs written by Dave Bassett (songwriter)
Columbia Records singles
Number-one singles in Scotland
UK Singles Chart number-one singles
Songs containing the I–V-vi-IV progression